Jack Edgeley (21 March 1887 – 18 April 1944) was an Australian rules footballer who played with Fitzroy in the Victorian Football League (VFL).

Notes

External links 

1887 births
1944 deaths
English emigrants to Australia
Fitzroy Football Club players
VFL/AFL players born in England
Australian rules footballers from Victoria (Australia)
Sportspeople from London
People from Poplar, London